Holly Springs Township (also designated Township 6) is one of twenty townships within Wake County, North Carolina, United States. As of the 2010 census, Holly Springs Township had a population of 33,071, a 102.8% increase over 2000.

Holly Springs Township, occupying  in southwestern Wake County, includes most of the town of Holly Springs and portions of the towns of Apex and Fuquay-Varina.

References

Townships in Wake County, North Carolina
Townships in North Carolina